José Francisco Ramón Vicente Pablo Pereira Martínez (January 11, 1783 - August 20, 1863) was a Colombian lawyer of Spanish and Portuguese descent. The city of Pereira is named after him.

19th-century Colombian lawyers
1789 births
1863 deaths
Colombian people of Portuguese descent
Pereira, Colombia